Nemapogon nevadella is a moth of the family Tineidae. It is found in Italy and on the Iberian Peninsula, Sardinia and the Balearic Islands.

References

Moths described in 1920
Nemapogoninae